George W. Sharswood School is a K-8 school located in the Whitman neighborhood of Philadelphia, Pennsylvania. It is a part of the School District of Philadelphia.

History
The school building was designed by Henry deCourcy Richards and built in 1906–1908. It is a three-story, seven bay, brick building in the Colonial Revival-style. It features projecting end bays with entrances, a large stone cornice, and brick and stone parapet. The building was added to the National Register of Historic Places in 1988.

In 2008 Jack Stollsteimer, a former U.S. attorney, and an area school safety advocate, criticized the school after the principal failed to report an assault of a student in a timely manner. As a result, the school district demanded more thorough reporting from its schools, and the rate of reported incidents sharply increased.

Feeder patterns
Neighborhoods assigned to Sharswood are also assigned to Furness High School.

References

External links
 George Sharswood School at School District of Philadelphia
 George Sharswood Elementary School at Weebly
 
 "George Sharswood Elementary School Geographic Boundaries" (Archive).

School buildings on the National Register of Historic Places in Philadelphia
Colonial Revival architecture in Pennsylvania
School buildings completed in 1908
School District of Philadelphia
South Philadelphia
1908 establishments in Pennsylvania
Public K–8 schools in Philadelphia